Radio Dum Dum was the world's first Malayalam Internet radio from Kerala, India which started in 2005 broadcasting an array of Malayalam music and related programs in Tamil. Their desktop player made Radio Dum Dum unique to other internet radio stations at the time.

Radio Dum Dum was the only Malayalam radio available through Spodtronics GPRS Spodradio.

History 
Radio Dum Dum started in September 2005 by youngsters in Cochin from different fields of entertainment and information technology fields. Radio Dum Dum started as a music station to cater the Non Resident Indian (NRI) community from Kerala. With positive responses, Radio Dum Dum started supporting streaming from operating systems other than Windows, including MacOS and Linux OS.

However, by March 2011, operations had ceased and their website was redirected to a placeholder.

The Re-Launch

Dum Dum Media Works FZC relaunched the brand as an online media streaming platform on 15 April 2014, utilizing multiple platforms including web player, desktop application, social media apps for Facebook and Google+. A mobile app version was also produced for iOS, Android and Windows.

Multi-Lingual Broadcast 
Radio Dum Dum introduced an integrated platform to accommodate Multi-Lingual Broadcast in order to cater to its wide-spread global audience. This enabled users to choose their preferred broadcast based on location, language and mood.

External links
 Boolokam.com
 RadioDumDum
 Mobile Radio
 Mobile Player

In the news
 Boolokam.com
 

Internet radio in India
Mass media in Kerala
Kerala diaspora
2005 establishments in Kerala
Radio stations established in 2005